15460 Manca, provisional designation , is a Koronian asteroid from the outer region of the asteroid belt, approximately 5 kilometers in diameter.

The asteroid was discovered on 25 December 1998, by Italian astronomers Andrea Boattini and Luciano Tesi at Pistoia Mountains Astronomical Observatory in San Marcello Pistoiese, central Italy. It was named for Italian amateur astronomer Francesco Manca.

Orbit and classification 

Manca belongs to the Koronis family, a family of stony asteroids in the outer main-belt with nearly ecliptical orbits. It orbits the Sun at a distance of 2.6–3.2 AU once every 4 years and 12 months (1,810 days). Its orbit has an eccentricity of 0.09 and an inclination of 3° with respect to the ecliptic.

The asteroid's observation arc begins 48 years prior to its official discovery observation, with a precovery taken at the Palomar Observatory in March 1950.

Physical characteristics 

Manca has also been characterized as an X-type asteroid by Pan-STARRS photometric survey.

Rotation period 

In August 2012, a rotational lightcurve was obtained for Manca from photometric observations made at the Palomar Transient Factory, California. It gave it a rotation period of  hours with a brightness variation of 0.22 magnitude.

Diameter and albedo 

According to the survey carried out by NASA's Wide-field Infrared Survey Explorer with its subsequent NEOWISE mission, Manca measures 5.35 kilometers in diameter and its surface has an albedo of 0.295. The Collaborative Asteroid Lightcurve Link assumes a stony standard albedo for members of the Koronis family of 0.24, and calculates a diameter of 5.17 kilometers with an absolute magnitude of 13.6.

Naming 

This minor planet was named for Italian amateur astronomer Francesco Manca (born 1966), member of the "Gruppo Astrofili Brianza" and an active observer of near-Earth objects, and potentially hazardous asteroids in particular, at Sormano Astronomical Observatory in northern Italy. The official naming citation was published by the Minor Planet Center on 13 October 2000.

References

External links 
 Asteroid Lightcurve Database (LCDB), query form (info )
 Dictionary of Minor Planet Names, Google books
 Minor Planet (15460) Manca, animation of CCD images
 Sormano Astronomical Observatory, IAU code 587
 Asteroids and comets rotation curves, CdR – Observatoire de Genève, Raoul Behrend
 Discovery Circumstances: Numbered Minor Planets (15001)-(20000) – Minor Planet Center
 
 

015460
Discoveries by Andrea Boattini
Discoveries by Luciano Tesi
Named minor planets
19981225